Roy is a census-designated place (CDP) in Fergus County, Montana, United States.

Description
Roy has a post office with the ZIP code 59471. As of the census of 2010, there were 108 people.

The post office opened in 1892. The Milwaukee Land Company platted the townsite in 1913.

Climate
Spring is mild and frequently thundery, whilst summer days are hot – sometimes very hot – but nights are usually pleasantly cool.

Precipitation is fairly scarce, mostly coming from thunderstorms during late spring and summer, whilst snowfall averages  (the median is ) but significant falls occur on only a minority of winter days. However, during the cold winter of 1977–78, cover reached  on February 19 and averaged  for the whole month of February.

Demographics

Education
Roy Public Schools educates students from kindergarten through 12th grade. Roy High School's team name is the Pirates.

See also

 List of census-designated places in Montana

References

External links

 Roy – Russell Country Montana

Census-designated places in Fergus County, Montana
Census-designated places in Montana